Miguel Ferrer (born March 28, 1987) is a Cuban footballer who last played for the Wichita Wings in the Major Indoor Soccer League.

Career

College
Ferrer grew up in Miami, Florida, played college soccer at the University of North Carolina at Pembroke, where he received all-conference, all-region, and all-American honors as a junior, and all-conference and all-region honors as a senior. In 2008 Ferrer studied in Germany and played a half season for the semi-pro soccer club SG Oppenweiler.

Professional
Undrafted by Major League Soccer out of college, Ferrer signed with Charlotte Eagles on March 8, 2010, after a good showing at their invitational-only tryout. He made his professional debut on May 1, 2010 in Charlotte's 2-1 loss against rival Charleston Battery at Charleston's Blackbaud Stadium.

In October 2011, Ferrer joined MISL side Norfolk SharX for the indoor season and he moved to Wichita Wings the following season.

References

External links
 Charlotte Eagles bio

1987 births
Living people
Place of birth missing (living people)
Cuban footballers
Charlotte Eagles players
USL Second Division players
USL Championship players
UNC Pembroke Braves men's soccer players
Major Indoor Soccer League (2008–2014) players
Wichita Wings (2011–2013 MISL) players
Association football midfielders
Soccer players from Miami
Expatriate footballers in Germany